In grammar, the perlative case (abbreviated ) is a grammatical case which expresses that something moved "through", "across", or "along" the referent of the noun that is marked. The case is found in a number of Australian Aboriginal languages such as Kuku-Yalanji and Kaurna, as well as in Aymara, Inuktitut, and the extinct Tocharian languages.

See also
 Prolative case

References

Grammatical cases